Júlio César Basilio da Silva (born 6 December 1996) is a Brazilian professional footballer who plays as a centre-back for Liga 1 club Borneo Samarinda.

References

External links 
 
 Player's profile at pressball.by

1996 births
Living people
Brazilian footballers
Footballers from São Paulo (state)
Association football defenders
Brazilian expatriate footballers
Expatriate footballers in Spain
Expatriate footballers in Belarus
Expatriate footballers in Indonesia
América Futebol Clube (RN) players
Brazilian expatriate sportspeople in Spain
Brazilian expatriate sportspeople in Belarus
Brazilian expatriate sportspeople in Indonesia
FC Vitebsk players
Borneo F.C. players
Liga 1 (Indonesia) players